Hollweg is a surname of German origin. Notable people with the surname include:

Alexander Hollweg (1936–2020), British painter and sculptor
Ilse Hollweg (1922–1990), German operatic coloratura soprano
Rebecca Hollweg (born 1964), English singer-songwriter
Ryan Hollweg (born 1983),  American professional ice hockey forward

See also
August von Bethmann-Hollweg (1795–1877), German jurist and Prussian politician
Joachim von Bethmann-Hollweg (1911–2001), German ice hockey player
Theobald von Bethmann-Hollweg (1856–1921), German politician and statesman

German-language surnames